Barfee or Barfée can refer to:
Barfi, a milk and nut sweet originating in the Indian Subcontinent
Barfi!, a 2012 Indian film
Barfi (film), a 2013 Indian film
William Barfée (pronounced barf-AY), a character from the musical The 25th Annual Putnam County Spelling Bee